Liu Sai ((?–?)) was a Chinese government official of the Song Dynasty.

Biography 
tai chang si shao qing
Guang Zhou zhi mou zhou jun zhou shi
Chang Zhou zhi mou zhou jun zhou shi
Ming Zhou zhi mou zhou jun zhou shi
Tan Zhou zhi mou zhou jun zhou shi
san si hu bu pan guan
zhi zhao wen guan
si feng si yuan wai lang
bing bu lang zhong
shang shu sheng xing bu xing bu si lang zhong
shang shu sheng xing bu du guan si yuan wai lang
san si du zhi pan guan

Family 
father: Liu Yi

External links

Song dynasty politicians
Year of birth unknown
Year of death unknown